Jump Street is an American multimedia franchise that commenced in 1987. The franchise concerns the lives of the Jump Street program, an undercover police unit in which young-looking detectives infiltrate schools and similar settings attended by minors to investigate crimes.

Television series

21 Jump Street (1987-1991)

21 Jump Street is an American police procedural crime drama television series that aired on Fox with a total of 103 episodes.

Booker (1989-1990)

Booker is an American crime drama series starring Richard Grieco that aired on Fox. The series is a spin-off of 21 Jump Street and the second installment of the 21 Jump Street franchise.

Film

21 Jump Street (2012)

22 Jump Street (2014)

MIB 23
In September 2014, a third Jump Street film was announced to be in development. Channing Tatum has yet to sign on to the project, citing his apprehensions being due to not "know[ing] if that joke works three times". By August 2015, it was revealed that Lord and Miller signed onto the project as writers and producers. A first draft of the film's script has been completed, that incorporates the various sequel stories teased during the end-credits of 22 Jump Street.

In December 2014, it was revealed that the film would be a crossover between the studio's Men in Black and Jump Street film series. The news was leaked after Sony's system was hacked and then confirmed by the directors of the films, Chris Miller and Phil Lord, during an interview about it. James Bobin signed on as director in January 2016. The title of the crossover was later revealed to be MIB 23. By August 2016, Jonah Hill stated that MIB 23 would be hard to make, as "They’re trying to make all the deals, but it’s kind of impossible with all the Men in Black stuff", and "it’s hard to maintain that joke when it’s so high stakes" given the film would get too close to the sort of remake, sequel and reboot the previous films mocked, though expressed hope at the film being made. In December 2016 it was revealed that Rodney Rothman had written the script for the film, with Bobin still contractually attached as director for the movie, and that the film has been scheduled for a 2021 release; however, by January 2019 Lord stated that although the project is still actively being developed, 24 Jump Street would be produced first, noting that all creatives involved are "reserving" MIB 23 for a later date.

Cast and characters

Reception

Box office performance

Critical and public response

References

21 Jump Street
20th Television franchises
Columbia Pictures franchises
Metro-Goldwyn-Mayer franchises
Film franchises introduced in 2012
Television franchises introduced in 1987